Park is a restaurant housed in the Park Hotel Kenmare, Kenmare, County Kerry, Ireland. It is a fine dining restaurant that was awarded one Michelin star each year in the period 1983-1990 and in the period 1994–1999. The Egon Ronay Guide awarded the restaurant one star in the period 1983–1984.

The restaurant is housed in the 5-star hotel "Park Hotel Kenmare", which was established in 1897.

In the periods that the restaurant was awarded Michelin stars, headchef were Colin O'Daly (1983-1985), Brian Cleere (1994-1995), Bruno Schmidt and the late Matthew d'Arcy

See also
List of Michelin starred restaurants in Ireland

References

External links 
 Official site

Restaurants in the Republic of Ireland
Michelin Guide starred restaurants in Ireland
County Kerry